Celebrate the Magic was a nighttime show at the Magic Kingdom park of Walt Disney World, that premiered on November 13, 2012. It replaced The Magic, the Memories and You display, a similar show that ran at the Magic Kingdom and Disneyland from January 2011 to September 4, 2012.

Celebrate the Magic takes place on Cinderella Castle and includes a contemporary musical score, projection mappings, pyrotechnics and lighting. A three-dimensional computer-generated rendering of Cinderella Castle was released by Disney in August 2012, revealing some of the various designs that will be displayed on the structure.

On October 26, 2016, it was announced that the show would be replaced by Once Upon a Time formerly from Tokyo Disneyland. The last Celebrate the Magic took place on November 3, 2016.

Plot
Tinker Bell introduces the show as she appears flying over the castle's turrets. The castle is transformed into a paper canvas as Walt Disney appears sketching Mickey Mouse in his iconic Steamboat Willie appearance. Tinkerbell enchants a paintbrush, which then becomes the host of the show. A kaleidoscope featuring images of Mickey, Donald Duck and Goofy are projected followed soon after by short clips from Cinderella, Pinocchio and The Princess and the Frog. The show then progresses into longer, classic scenes from Disney films, including; Alice in Wonderland, Dumbo, Wreck-It Ralph, The Lion King, Tarzan,  The Jungle Book, Lady and the Tramp, Tangled, Toy Story, Pirates of the Caribbean and Frozen. The show's climax features a fast-paced montage of characters and scenes from such other Disney films as Snow White and the Seven Dwarfs, Bambi, Sleeping Beauty, Pocahontas, Up, Peter Pan, The Little Mermaid, Finding Nemo, Beauty and the Beast, Aladdin, and Tangled. During the montage Walt Disney appears again, via archival footage, reciting one of his most famous quotes; "I only hope that we never lose sight of one thing – that it was all started by a mouse". The show then proceeds into a synchronized pyrotechnic finale.

Seasonal outlook
Similar to its predecessor, Celebrate the Magic will showcase sequences from that will be appropriately themed to seasonal parts of the year. The show premiered with the original Christmas segment from The Magic, the Memories and You. The summer months show films such as Phineas and Ferb, The Little Mermaid and Lilo & Stitch, in addition, segments featuring Disney Princesses and couples for Valentine's Day and Disney Villains for Halloween are shown, and in the winter, Frozen is showcased.

The summer edition debuted during the Monstrous Summer All-Nighter event on May 24, 2013 until August 31, 2013. The Halloween edition featuring the Disney villains debuted on September 1, 2013 until October 31, 2013.
A new segment based on Frozen debuted on November 17, 2013 replacing a segment based on Brave.

See also
 Celebrate! Tokyo Disneyland
 Disneyland Forever
 Together Forever: A Pixar Nighttime Spectacular
 Once Upon a Time

References

External links

Magic Kingdom
Walt Disney Parks and Resorts entertainment